Deborah Hughes (born 23 August 1977) is a South African former cricketer who played as a right-arm pace bowler. She appeared in two One Day Internationals for South Africa in 1997, both against Ireland.

References

External links
 

1977 births
Living people
Cricketers from Bloemfontein
South African women cricketers
South Africa women One Day International cricketers
20th-century South African women
21st-century South African women